St. Paul's Church is a church located in the Rörsjöstaden neighbourhood of Malmö, Sweden. The church was designed in an Italian medieval brickwork style by Emil Victor Langlet, construction began in 1880 and the church opened on November 26, 1882. 

The church last underwent an almost two-year long renovation before reopening in March 2017.

References

External links

 

19th-century Church of Sweden church buildings
Churches in the Diocese of Lund
Churches in Malmö
Churches completed in 1882
1882 establishments in Sweden